Iwasaki (岩崎 or 岩﨑, "rock peninsula") is a Japanese surname. Notable people with the surname include:

Akira Iwasaki (岩崎昶), Japanese film critic and producer
Carl Iwasaki, American college baseball coach
Chihiro Iwasaki (岩崎知弘), Japanese illustrator
Fukuzo Iwasaki (岩崎福三), Japanese real estate magnate and chairman of Iwasaki Sangyo Group
Hidenori Iwasaki (岩崎英則), Japanese video game music composer
Hiromi Iwasaki (singer) (岩崎宏美), Japanese singer
Hiroshi Iwasaki (岩崎ひろし), Japanese actor and voice actor
, Japanese swimmer
Kazusa Iwasaki (岩﨑知瑳), Japanese footballer 
Kyoko Iwasaki (岩崎恭子), former breaststroke swimmer
Makoto Iwasaki, Japanese engineer
Masami Iwasaki (岩崎征実, born 1971), Japanese voice actor
Minako Iwasaki (岩崎美奈子), Japanese illustrator, game character designer and manga artist
Mineko Iwasaki (岩崎峰子, 岩崎究香), Retired geiko (geisha)
Pablo Larios Iwasaki, Mexican football goalkeeper
Sebastian Iwasaki, Polish figure skater
, Japanese ice hockey player
Shun-ichi Iwasaki (岩崎俊一), Japanese engineer, researcher, winner of the Japan Prize in 2010
, the member of Japanese boy group, Bishounen, and actor
Taku Iwasaki (岩崎琢), Japanese composer
Tomás Iwasaki, Peruvian football forwarder
Toshihiko Iwasaki, Japanese hurdler
Yataro Iwasaki (岩崎弥太郎), founder of Mitsubishi
Yohei Iwasaki (岩﨑陽平), Japanese footballer
Yoshimi Iwasaki (岩崎良美), Japanese singer

Fictional characters
Minami Iwasaki of Lucky Star
Ryuji Iwasaki of Tokumei Sentai Go-Busters
Rio Iwasaki of Persona 3 Portable

See also
Iwatsu Electric, a Japanese electronics company
Ishizaki

Japanese-language surnames